Wyatt Hall is a property in Franklin, Tennessee that was listed on the National Register of Historic Places in 1980. It was built or has other significance in c.1805 and 1847. It includes Federal architecture.

The building is one of the oldest houses in Middle Tennessee, and its walls were plastered with a mix of hogs' hair, lime, and sand.  A smokehouse and a storage shed stand on the property, both "original" log structures.

References

Houses on the National Register of Historic Places in Tennessee
Houses in Franklin, Tennessee
Federal architecture in Tennessee
Houses completed in 1805
1805 establishments in Tennessee
National Register of Historic Places in Williamson County, Tennessee